Harry L. Gessert was a member of the Wisconsin State Assembly.

Biography
Gessert was born on July 16, 1901, in Elkhart Lake, Wisconsin. Gessert went to Elkhart Lake School and Plymouth Business College. He went on to operate a restaurant and a retail store. He died on May 19, 1992.

Political career
Gessert was first elected to the Assembly in 1960. Previously, he was elected a justice of the peace in 1955 and a member of the Sheboygan County, Wisconsin Board in 1959. He was a Republican.

References

People from Elkhart Lake, Wisconsin
Republican Party members of the Wisconsin State Assembly
American justices of the peace
County supervisors in Wisconsin
Businesspeople from Wisconsin
1901 births
1992 deaths
20th-century American businesspeople
20th-century American judges
20th-century American politicians